The South Valley Surprise of 2002 was a Pacific Northwest windstorm that affected the U.S. states of Oregon, Washington, California, Nevada, and Idaho on February 7, 2002.

Overview 

The storm underwent rapid cyclogenesis just before travelling inland. The circulation was so small in area that the isobars were compacted tightly, thanks to a strong ridge of high pressure to the south, resulting  in sustained winds of 50 mph with gusts above 70 mph. The South Valley Surprise was second only to the Columbus Day Storm in terms of wind speed for the southern Willamette Valley. The "surprise" was how rapidly the storm organized and matured, and its unanticipated strength. Thus, the public had no idea of the impending storm. The storm was able to tap into the jet stream and aim it towards the surface the phenomenon known as "Jet stream enhancement", which usually occurs in the unstable air found in a cold front in a mid latitude cyclone. The result was extensive damage to structures both directly and indirectly from falling trees and debris.

See also
Hanukkah Eve windstorm of 2006
Great Coastal Gale of 2007
January 2012 Pacific Northwest snowstorm

References 

2002 meteorology
Natural disasters in California
Natural disasters in Idaho
Natural disasters in Nevada
Natural disasters in Oregon
Natural disasters in Washington (state)
2002 natural disasters in the United States
Pacific Northwest storms
2002 in California
2002 in Idaho
2002 in Nevada
2002 in Oregon
2002 in Washington (state)
February 2002 events in the United States